Consalvo, also occasionally spelled Gonsalvo and also rarely Consalvos, is an Italian male given name. It also occurs as a surname. Its name day is February the 5th.

Origin
It is derived from the medieval Latin name Gundisalvus, which was the Latin form of a Germanic name of Visigoth origin. The original Visigothic name was composed of the elements gund (meaning "war") and salv (meaning uncertain, but could be "saved", "preserved" or "unhurt"). It has also been claimed that, more specifically, it means "him who rescues/helps in battle". It is related to the name Gonzalo

Given name
Notable people with this given name include:
 Consalvo Caputo, Italian Catholic prelate
 Consalvo Carelli, Italian painter
 Consalvo de Cordoba, also known as Gonzalo Fernández de Córdoba, Spanish general
 Consalvo Sanesi, Italian driver

Surname
Notable people with this surname include:
 Jen Consalvo, American entrepreneur
 Louis Consalvo, American mobster
 Robert Consalvo, American politician

See also
 Gonzalo (name) (Spanish and others)
 Gonçalo (disambiguation) (Portuguese)

References